Snowflake is an unincorporated community in Scott County, Virginia, United States. Its post office closed in April 1961.

References

Unincorporated communities in Scott County, Virginia
Unincorporated communities in Virginia